Robyn Bluhm (born 1969), is associate professor at the Department of Philosophy and Lyman Briggs College, Michigan State University, as well as a member of The NeuroGenderings Network – a group which promotes "neurofeminism". She is the current joint editor of the IJFAB: International Journal of Feminist Approaches to Bioethics

Research 
Bluhm's research interests include the philosophy of evidence-based practice and the use of functional neuroimaging in psychiatry.

Books

See also 
 Cognitive neuroscience
 Gender essentialism
 Neuroscience of sex differences
 List of cognitive neuroscientists

References

External links 
 

Canadian philosophers
1969 births
Feminist philosophers
Living people
Michigan State University faculty
University of Western Ontario alumni
Canadian women philosophers